The Malaysia Australia Business Council (MABC) is a non-profit business chamber founded in 1986 with the aim of promoting the interests of its members based in Malaysia with business links to Australia.

As an active business chamber, the council provides a forum for Malaysian and Australian linked businesses and business people.  The MABC works closely with the governments of both countries and plays an active role in developing the bilateral relationship.  It is led by an Executive Committee made up of prominent business people from both countries.  It's co-patrons are the Malaysian Minister of Trade & Industry and the Australian High Commissioner.

The MABC works closely with its sister organisation in Australia, the Australia Malaysia Business Council (AMBC).

In recent years the MABC has seen a growth in activity due to the signing of the Malaysia Australia Free Trade Agreement (MAFTA) which has resulted in increasing bilateral trade between the two countries.

See also
Chamber of commerce
Australia–Malaysia relations

References

Organizations established in 1986
Business organisations based in Malaysia
Chambers of commerce
Australia–Malaysia relations
International organisations based in Malaysia
Foreign trade of Australia